Pakistan Peoples Party Workers (abbreviated PPP-W) is a breakaway faction of Pakistan Peoples Party. The aggrieved workers of the party founded it on October 22, 2014. Safdar Ali Abbasi was elected to its presidency through resolution.  The party was registered with the Election Commission on May 8, 2015 by its president.

References 

Social democratic parties in Pakistan
Pakistan People's Party breakaway groups
Political parties in Pakistan
2015 establishments in Pakistan
Secularism in Pakistan